Jacques Nieuwenhuis (born 23 March 1980 in Brakpan, South Africa) is a former professional rugby union player and currently a referee on the contenders squad panel of the South African Rugby Referees' Association.

He regularly played as a flanker or number eight.

Namibia

He scored a try in 's first match in the 2007 Rugby World Cup in a game against . He later blotted his copybook by being the first Namibian to be sent off at a World Cup against .

References

External links
 
 
 Jacques Nieuwenhuis on It's Rugby

1980 births
Living people
People from Brakpan
White Namibian people
Namibian Afrikaner people
Namibian people of Dutch descent
Rugby union number eights
Namibian rugby union players
Namibian expatriate rugby union players
Expatriate rugby union players in France
Expatriate rugby union players in South Africa
Namibian expatriate sportspeople in South Africa
Namibian expatriate sportspeople in France
Namibia international rugby union players
Sportspeople from Gauteng